Juan Ignacio Sánchez, or Pepe Sánchez, is an Argentine-Spanish professional basketball player.

Pepe Sánchez may also refer to:
Pepe Sánchez (trova) (1856–1918), Cuban musician
Pepe Sánchez (footballer) (born 2000), Spanish footballer
Jose Sanchez (disambiguation), 'Pepe' being a diminutive for 'Jose'
Pepe Sánchez (film director), Colombian film director and actor, see Guajira (telenovela)